Sarıyahşi District is a district of Aksaray Province of Turkey. Its seat is the town Sarıyahşi. Its area is 210 km2, and its population is 5,183 (2021).

The district is good agricultural land watered by Hirfanlı Dam reservoir, and used for growing grain and other crops. There is a uranium mine in the village of Bekdik and various stone quarries.

Composition
There is one municipality in Sarıyahşi District:
 Sarıyahşi

There are 6 villages in Sarıyahşi District:

 Bekdik
 Boğazköy
 Demirciobası
 Sipahiler
 Yaylak
 Yenitorunobası

References

Districts of Aksaray Province